The following is a list of charter schools in Idaho (including networks of such schools) grouped by county.

Ada County

 Anser Charter School
 Cardinal Academy
 Compass Public Charter School
 Doral Academy of Idaho
 Falcon Ridge Public Charter School
 Future Public Charter School
 Gem Prep: Meridian, Meridian North
 Idaho Technical Career Academy
 Idaho Virtual Academy
 Inspire Connections Academy
 iSucceed Virtual High School
 Meridian Medical Arts Charter High School
 Meridian Technical Charter High School
 North Star Charter School
 Peace Valley Public Charter School
 Project Impact STEM Academy
 Rolling Hills Charter School
 Sage International School of Boise
 Village Leadership Academy

Bannock County

 Chief Tahgee Elementary Academy
 Connor Academy
 Gem Prep: Pocatello

Bingham County

 Bingham Academy
 Blackfoot Charter Community Learning Center
 Idaho Science & Technology Charter School

Blaine County
 Syringa Mountain School

Bonner County
 Forrest M. Bird Charter School

Bonneville County

 Alturas International Academy/Preparatory Academy
 American Heritage Charter School
 Monticello Montessori School
 Taylor's Crossing Public Charter School
 White Pine Charter School

Canyon County

 Another Choice Virtual Charter School
 Elevate Academy
 Forge International School
 Gem Prep: Nampa
 Heritage Community Charter School
 Idaho Arts Charter School
 Idaho Connects Online School
 Legacy Charter School
 Liberty Charter School
 MOSAICS Public School
 Pathways in Education: Nampa
 Thomas Jefferson Charter School
 Victory Charter School
 Vision Charter School

Elmore County
 Richard McKenna Charter School

Franklin County
 Southeastern ID Technical Charter School

Fremont County
 Island Park Charter School

Gem County
 Payette River Technical Academy

Gooding County
 North Valley Academy

Jerome County
 Heritage Academy

Kootenai County

 Coeur d'Alene Charter Academy
 Hayden Canyon Charter School
 Kootenai Bridge Academy
 North Idaho STEM Charter Academy

Latah County

 Gem Prep: Online
 Moscow Charter School
 Palouse Prairie Charter School

Lemhi County

 Fern Waters Public Charter School
 Upper Carmen Public Charter School

Payette County
 Treasure Valley Classical Academy

Twin Falls County

 Pinecrest Academy of Idaho
 RISE Charter School
 Xavier Charter School

References

School districts
School districts